James Thomas Brown (October 22, 1871 – April 28, 1957) was a lawyer, judge and political figure in Saskatchewan. He represented Souris in the Legislative Assembly of Saskatchewan from 1905 to 1908 as a Provincial Rights Party member.

He was born in Huntingdon, Quebec, the son of Samuel Brown and Margaret White, and was educated there and at McGill University. Brown moved to Manitoba in 1833 and to Saskatchewan in 1896. He practised law in Moosomin, Saskatchewan and later served as Crown Prosecutor for Assiniboia district. In 1922, he married Alice M. Lewis. Brown was an unsuccessful candidate for a seat in the House of Commons in 1908. He later lived in Regina. Brown served as a puisne judge for the Supreme Court of Saskatchewan. He was named Chief Justice for the Saskatchewan Court of King's Bench in 1918.  Brown died in Regina on April 28, 1957, at the age of 86.

References 

Saskatchewan Provincial Rights Party MLAs
1871 births
1957 deaths
Judges in Saskatchewan
McGill University alumni